Michael G. Basha (20 January 1896 – 26 November 1976) was a Canadian businessman, manufacturer, and Senator.

Born in Baalbeck, Ottoman Empire, he was summoned to the Canadian Senate in 1951 and represented the senatorial division of West Coast, Newfoundland and Labrador. A Liberal, he resigned in November 1976 shortly before his death. Basha is considered the first Arab politician to be appointed to the Canadian Senate. He is also one of the first Arab politicians in Canadian history.

See also
 List of Newfoundland and Labrador senators

External links
 

1896 births
1976 deaths
Canadian senators from Newfoundland and Labrador
Lebanese emigrants to Canada
Canadian politicians of Lebanese descent
Lebanese people in Newfoundland and Labrador